Royal Air Force Acklington, simply known as RAF Acklington, is a former Royal Flying Corps and Royal Air Force station located  south west of Amble, Northumberland and  north east of Morpeth, Northumberland.

The airfield was operational initially from 1916 being used by the Royal Flying Corps (RFC) and from April 1918 its successor the Royal Air Force (RAF) before being closed in 1920 however it was reopened in 1938 being used by the RAF until 1972. After 1972 the site was turned over to Her Majesty's Prison Service for the creation of two new prisons.

History

First World War

Acklington was an aerodrome during the First World War and known as Royal Flying Corps Station Southfields.

Second World War

The airfield was reopened on Friday 1 April 1938 being renamed to RAF Acklington where No. 7 Armament Training Station was formed which on 15 November 1938 transformed into No. 2 Air Observers School. During September 1939 the school moved to RAF Warmwell and the airfield was handed over to RAF Fighter Command as part of 13 Group where it became a sector airfield.

The following squadrons were at some point posted or attached to RAF Acklington:

 43, 46, 111, 152, 245, 258, 600, 607 and 609.

On 3 February 1940 three Hawker Hurricane fighters from 43 Squadron at Acklington intercepted and shot down a Luftwaffe Heinkel He 111 bomber at Whitby. The formation was led by Flight Lieutenant Peter Townsend. It was the first German aircraft to fall on English soil in the Second World War (although it was not the first to be shot down in the United Kingdom, that having occurred in Scotland). The intercept was based on a plot by operators at RAF Danby Beacon, a radar station about ten miles west of Whitby. Townsend visited the German rear gunner in hospital the next day, and visited him again in 1968 when Townsend was writing his highly-successful book about the Battle of Britain, "Duel of Eagles," which recounts the incident in detail.

On 21 October 1942 well known test pilot Gerry Sayer departed from RAF Acklington in a Hawker Typhoon to test a gunsight during gun firing into Druridge Bay Ranges, and was accompanied by another Typhoon. Neither aircraft returned and it was assumed that they collided over the bay. Sayer was replaced as Gloster's chief test pilot by his deputy, Michael Daunt.

Battle of Britain

RAF Acklington was home to the following squadrons during the Battle of Britain:
 72 Squadron between 6 June 1940 and 31 August 1940 with the Supermarine Spitfire Mk I before moving to RAF Biggin Hill.
 79 Squadron between 13 July 1940 and 27 August 1940 with the Hawker Hurricane Mk I before moving to RAF Biggin Hill.
 32 Squadron between 28 August 1940 and 15 December 1940 with the Hurricane Mk I before moving to RAF Middle Wallop.
 610 Squadron between 31 August 1940 and 15 December 1940 with the Spitfire Mk I before moving to RAF Westhampnett.

October 1940–1945

The following squadrons were at some point posted or attached to RAF Acklington:

 1, 25, 43, 56, 63, 74, 130, 141, 164, 167, 198, 219, 222, 263, 266, 278, 288, 289, 291, 309, 315, 316, 317, 322, 349, 350, 406, 409, 410, 504, 539 and 609.

Postwar use
The following squadron were at some point posted or attached to RAF Acklington:

 18, 19 with Mustang's, 23, 25, 29 with Meteor's & Javelin's, 41, 54, 56, 64, 65, 66 with Hunter's, 74, 85, 91, 92, 130, 140, 202, 219 with Mosquitoes, 228, 247, 257, 263 with Meteor's, 264, 266 and 275.

Airfield units

The following units were at some point posted or attached to RAF Southfields/Acklington:

Current use

RAF Acklington closed in 1975 and the main camp became the site of Acklington and Castington prisons.
These have since been amalgamated and transferred into private ownership and are simply known as H. M. P. Northumberland. The airfield is virtually unrecognisable today having been subjected to open cast coal mining.

See also
 List of former Royal Air Force stations

References

Citations

Bibliography

External links

RAF Acklington Record Book 1939–45 (Transcript)
Royal Air Force – RAF Acklington
Royal Air Force Battle of Britain – 13 Group Installations

Royal Air Force stations in Northumberland
Royal Air Force stations of World War II in the United Kingdom
Royal Flying Corps airfields